This is a list of the National Register of Historic Places listings in Wichita County, Texas.

This is intended to be a complete list of properties and districts listed on the National Register of Historic Places in Wichita County, Texas. There are three districts and nine individual properties listed on the National Register in the county. One district includes a State Antiquities Landmark and a Recorded Texas Historic Landmark. Four other individual properties are also Recorded Texas Historic Landmarks.

Current listings

The locations of National Register properties and districts may be seen in a mapping service provided.

|}

See also

National Register of Historic Places listings in Texas
Recorded Texas Historic Landmarks in Wichita County

References

External links

Registered Historic Places
Wichita County
Buildings and structures in Wichita County, Texas